Hard On is a 14-track music video compilation by Frankie Goes to Hollywood. It was released by ZTT Records in 2000. The compilation contains all main music videos and includes interviews with Paul Rutherford, Trevor Horn, Paul Morley, Paul Lester and Gary Farrow. It also includes The story of Frankie Goes To Hollywood and ZTT Records as well as a picture gallery of record sleeves, photographs, press articles and magazine covers. In 2009, a new CD compilation was released titled Frankie Say Greatest which was also released as a DVD. The DVD is an exact replica of Hard On except the cover work is different.

Formats
It was released on DVD in NTSC and PAL.

Track listing
 "Relax" – 4:07
 "Two Tribes" – 4:08
 "The Power of Love" – 4:57
 "Welcome to the Pleasuredome" – 7:51
 "Rage Hard" – 5:16
 "Warriors of the Wasteland" – 3:57
 "Watching the Wildlife" – 3:39
 "Relax (Live Version)" – 4:30
 "Relax (Laser Version)" – 3:53
 "Two Tribes '93 (Fluke Remix)" – 4:16
 "The Power of Love (Version 2)" – 4:58
 "Welcome to the Pleasuredome '93 (Altered Real Mix)" – 4:55
 "The Power of Love 2K (Rob Searle Remix)" – 4:13
 "Two Tribes 2K (Rob Searle Remix)" – 4:02

Video credits
Relax
Director: Bernard Rose
Producer:
Cinematographer:
Art Director:

Two Tribes
Director: Godley & Creme
Producers:
Cinematographer:
Art Director:

The Power of Love
Director: Godley & Creme
Producers:
Cinematographer:
Art Director:

Welcome to the Pleasuredome
Director: Bernard Rose
Producers:
Cinematographer:
Art Director:

Rage Hard
Director: Paul Morley
Producers:
Cinematographer:
Art Director:

Warriors of the Wasteland
Director: Nick Burgess-Jones (Equinox Army)
Producers:
Cinematographer:
Art Director:

Watching the Wildlife
Director: Mike Portelly
Producers:
Cinematographer:
Art Director:

Relax (Live Version)
Director: David Mallet
Producers:
Cinematographer:
Art Director:

Relax (Laser Version)
Director: Godley & Creme
Producers:
Cinematographer:
Art Director:

Two Tribes '93
Director: Godley & Creme
Producers:
Cinematographer:
Art Director:

The Power of Love (Version 2)
Director: Godley & Creme
Producers:
Cinematographer:
Art Director:

Welcome to the Pleasuredome '93
Director: Bernard Rose
Producers:
Cinematographer:
Art Director:

The Power of Love 2K
Director: Clive Arrowsmith
Producers:
Cinematographer:
Art Director:

Two Tribes 2K
Director: Clive Arrowsmith
Producers:
Cinematographer:
Art Director:

References

Frankie Goes to Hollywood albums
2000 video albums